Sinclaire Morgan Miramontez (born April 11, 1998) is an American professional soccer player who last played as a defender for OL Reign of the National Women's Soccer League (NWSL).

Club career

North Carolina Courage
Miramontez made her NWSL debut on October 4, 2020. She was waived by the team on March 24, 2021.

Racing Louisville FC 
Miramontez was signed to Racing Louisville on May 21, 2021, after a successful trial period.

OL Reign 
On December 10, 2021, OL Reign acquired Miramontez off waivers.

Honors
OL Reign
 NWSL Shield: 2022
 The Women's Cup: 2022

References

External links
 
 Nebraska profile
 

1998 births
American women's soccer players
Living people
National Women's Soccer League players
North Carolina Courage players
Women's association football defenders
People from Lenexa, Kansas
Soccer players from Kansas
Nebraska Cornhuskers women's soccer players
North Carolina Courage draft picks
OL Reign players